LaPorte Church of Christ is an independent church in Laporte, Colorado, led by Peter J. Peters (November 13, 1946 – July 7, 2011) until his death in 2011. Critics labeled his message to be that of Christian Identity, although he rejected this label. The church is no longer associated with the decentralized group of churches that use the name "Churches of Christ".

The church served mainly as a platform for Peter's views and its membership never went above 100. It attracted white supremacists, including the members of the terrorist organization The Order who murdered radio talk show host Alan Berg with whom Peters had clashed on Berg's radio program.

The church became involved in a controversy in Colorado, related to an amendment against homosexuality, which led to it being fined for a minor violation of election laws. Peters refused to pay the fine and the church was seized by the state in February 1993 as the debt exceeded $10,000.

LaPorte operates Scriptures for America, a shortwave radio service that broadcasts via WTWW in Lebanon, Tennessee.

References

External links
 Scriptures for America Worldwide (Peter J. Peters' church website & radio show)
 Influential Christian Identity Pastor Dies

Buildings and structures in Larimer County, Colorado
Christian Identity